INS Bitra (T66), the second ship of  of the Indian Navy, is designed for interdiction against fast moving surface vessels and for search-and-rescue operations in coastal areas and in the exclusive economic zone. Named after Bitra atoll in Lakshadweep, the vessel was designed and built by Garden Reach Shipbuilders and Engineers. The diesel generators on board are supplied by Cummins India. The electronic equipment on board including satellite communication and global positioning systems is from Bharat Electronics Limited, ECIL and Hindustan Aeronautics Limited. Rear Admiral Sanjay Vadgaokar commissioned the fast attack ship in Vasco da Gama, Goa on 28 March 2006.

Operations

In February 2016 together with  visited Yangon in Myanmar on an official port visit.

References

Bangaram-class patrol vessels
Ships built in India
2004 ships